Joasaph Leliukhin (born Vitaliy M. Lelyukhin, 28 April 1903 – 24 April 1966) was Bishop of the Russian Orthodox Church, Metropolitan of Kiev and Galicia and Exarch of Ukraine.

External links
 

1903 births
1966 deaths
People from Smolensk Oblast
People from Yelninsky Uyezd
Bishops of the Russian Orthodox Church
First Hierarchs of the Ukrainian Orthodox Church (Moscow Patriarchate)
Burials at Baikove Cemetery